Mark William Holsten is an American politician in Minnesota. Holsten, a Republican, served in the Minnesota House of Representatives from 1993 to 2002.  He represented district 56A until November 2002 and, after redistricting, won election in 52B but was appointed Deputy Commissioner of the Minnesota Department of Natural Resources before the following session started. He served as chairman of the House Environment and Natural Resources Finance Committee. Holsten was appointed to replace Eugene R. Merriam as Commissioner of the Department of Natural Resources starting in January 2007.

Holsten holds a bachelor's degree in sociology and history from the University of Minnesota Duluth and a teaching license from the University of Saint Thomas.

Electoral history
2002 MN State House Seat 52B
Mark Holsten (R), 58.75%
Rebecca Otto (DFL), 41.17%
2000 MN State House Seat 56A
Mark Holsten (R), 57.57%
Joan M. Beaver (DFL), 42.43%
1998 MN State House Seat 56A
Mark Holsten (R), 64.3%
Paul A. Hetland (DFL), 35.5%

External links 

1965 births
Living people
University of Minnesota Duluth alumni
University of St. Thomas (Minnesota) alumni
Republican Party members of the Minnesota House of Representatives
State cabinet secretaries of Minnesota
21st-century American politicians